Tasha McDowell was previously the head women's basketball coach at Western Michigan Broncos. She previously served as an assistant coach at the University of Wisconsin–Madison under head coach Lisa Stone. She was the defensive coach and recruiting coordinator of the Badgers. The 2006 campaign saw the Badger set the program record for wins at 23. From 2000 to 2005, she served as an assistant coach at UCSB.

She also coached as an assistant at Bradley University. She coached for two seasons as an assistant at Dayton University. She is a 1997 graduate of St. Ambrose University, where she earned a degree in mathematics.

External links
Tasha McDowell profile at WMUBroncos.com

Western Michigan Broncos women's basketball coaches
Wisconsin Badgers women's basketball coaches
UC Santa Barbara Gauchos women's basketball coaches
Living people
American women's basketball coaches
Year of birth missing (living people)
21st-century American women